Mortal Kombat: The Album is a soundtrack album by The Immortals (Maurice "Praga Khan" Engelen and Olivier Adams), released in 1994 to accompany the home versions of the video game Mortal Kombat. Television commercials for the home versions included a brief plug for the album at the end. 

Engelen and Adams were invited by Midway Games following the success of their techno/industrial/new beat band Lords of Acid, and were then provided with a copy of the game, detailed information about the various characters, and a library of sound effects to sample, being given one month to compose an album in-between tours of their project. The album featured a techno song for each of the 7 playable characters, as well as boss Goro, along with two additional tracks. One of those,  "Hypnotic House (Mortal Kombat)" was used as an intro in the Mortal Kombat Sega CD.

The other, "Techno Syndrome (Mortal Kombat)", was the only solo effort, as Engelen had left for a meeting of his record label, leaving Adams to do the song by himself in his Atari ST computer. "Techno Syndrome", with its signature scream of "Mortal Kombat!" - taken from the "Mortal Monday" commercial advertising the home console version of the game - has subsequently become famous as "the Mortal Kombat theme song" because of its use in the 1995 film, and remixed versions of the song continue to be associated with the Mortal Kombat franchise. The soundtrack reached number 10 on the Billboard 200 charts. Jonathan Oyama, writing for Venturebeat claims that Techno Sydrome is based on "Twilight Zone" by 2 Unlimited, but Adams and Engelen have said that the resemblance was a coincidence, and that no legal action was taken. The scream was done by actor Kyle Wyatt.

"Techno Syndrome" is also a hidden song featured in the Sega CD version of Mortal Kombat when one chooses to enter the "soundtrack" mode at the Sega CD intro screen.  It can also be accessed by putting the CD in a CD player and selecting track 17. The album peaked at #16 on the Billboard Heatseekers in the United States.

Track listing
All songs written by Maurice Engelen and Olivier Adams except where noted.
"Johnny Cage (Prepare Yourself)"
"Kano (Use Your Might)"
"Sub-Zero (Chinese Ninja Warrior)"
"Liu Kang (Born In China)"
"Techno Syndrome (Mortal Kombat)" – written by Olivier Adams
"Scorpion (Lost Soul Bent On Revenge)"
"Sonya (Go Go Go)"
"Rayden (Eternal Life)"
"Goro (The Outworld Prince)"
"Hypnotic House (Mortal Kombat)"

Other renditions 
"Utah Saints Take on the Theme from Mortal Kombat" was a remix by the Utah Saints that was a track on the 1995 soundtrack album.

Benjamin Wallfisch composed "Techno Syndrome 2021" as the theme song for the reboot film. It peaked at number 5 on the Billboard Dance/Electronic Digital Song Sales and number 15 on the Hot Dance/Electronic Songs chart.

References

1994 soundtrack albums
Mortal Kombat: Album
Video game soundtracks
Techno albums
Rave albums
Virgin Records soundtracks